Battlefield is a village and suburb of the town of Shrewsbury in Shropshire, England. The village is today split between three civil parishes - Shrewsbury, Astley and Pimhill.

Battle of Shrewsbury

It was roughly here that the Battle of Shrewsbury of 1403 took place. A church, commonly known as "Battlefield Church", but officially St. Mary Magdalene Church, was built in memory of the thousands who died.

Today the Battlefield Heritage Park is a visitor attraction, commemorating and interpreting the battle site.

Modern day Battlefield
The A49 runs through Battlefield, on its way from Shrewsbury to Whitchurch, as does the Welsh Marches Line (the Shrewsbury to Crewe railway line). The A53 begins its route at Battlefield.

Battlefield has two pubs. The Red Lion is the elder pub, and The Two Henrys is to the north of the Battlefield roundabout, as is the church, which lies just off the A49.

Also recently opened adjacent to the Two Henrys is a Spar Convenience store, which is the first in the UK to have a smoothie bar, and also Wi-fi networking.

Expansion of Shrewsbury
The town of Shrewsbury has over the past 10 years grown substantially in this area and the village is now part of the town. It is however split by a large Shrewsbury bypass roundabout ("Battlefield Roundabout"), one of the busiest in the county town.

The new Shrewsbury livestock market and a small hotel and service station has been built just off the A53 near the Battlefield Roundabout.

An industrial and business estate, the Battlefield Enterprise Park, has grown up in between the older Shrewsbury suburb of Harlescott and Battlefield.  It is located on the site of the Battle of Shrewsbury and the village of Battlefield is nearby.  A large part of the battlefield is, however, protected as a heritage site. Even so, the Battlefield Link Road (the A5124) runs straight through it and a car park has been built for visitors. The first businesses moved in during the mid-1990s, though the park became more established later that decade when the Battlefield Link Road, the A5124, was built.  The park is near the A49 and A53 and it is also adjacent to the Welsh Marches Line.

Governance
Battlefield is as an electoral ward of Shrewsbury Town Council and also Shropshire Council. The population of this ward at the 2011 census was 4,193.

See also
 Upper Battlefield
 Haughmond Hill, a nearby wood and landmark

References

External links

Villages in Shropshire
Suburbs of Shrewsbury